Melikhaya Frans (born 2 January 1990) is a South African long-distance runner.

In 2018, he competed in the men's half marathon at the 2018 IAAF World Half Marathon Championships held in Valencia, Spain. He finished in 60th place.

References

External links 
 

Living people
1990 births
Place of birth missing (living people)
South African male long-distance runners
20th-century South African people
21st-century South African people